Taveras or Tavera is a Spanish language surname. It may refer to:

Alex Taveras (born 1955), baseball infielder
Andrés Luna de San Pedro y Pardo de Tavera
Angel Taveras (born 1970), Dominican-American lawyer
Bartolomé Tavera Acosta
Ben Tavera King
Diego Tavera Ponce de Léon
Frank Taveras (born 1949), baseball shortstop
Hank M. Tavera
Giselle Tavera (born 1993), singer
Juan Tavera
Juan Pardo de Tavera
Juan Manuel Taveras Rodríguez (1919—2002), radiologist and pioneer in neuroradiology
Leody Taveras (born 1998), a Dominican professional baseball player
Maria Cristina Tavera, American artist
Massiel Taveras (born 1984), beauty queen
Michael Tavera
Norlandy Taveras
Oscar Taveras (1992–2014), Dominican-Canadian professional baseball outfielder
Trinidad Pardo de Tavera
Willy Taveras (born 1981), baseball outfielder

Spanish-language surnames